Görele is a town and a district of Giresun Province on the Black Sea coast of eastern Turkey. The population was 16,033 in 2010.

Geography
The district is mainly mountainous and watered by streams and rivers running into the Black Sea, the highest peaks are Mount Sis and Haç (Haş). Up to 600m the hillsides are covered with hazelnuts, along with alder, poplars and other deciduous trees. The agriculture of the district is mainly hazelnuts along with some tea planting, beekeeping, and gardening for domestic consumption, while the higher elevations are forest and pasture.

Recently trout farming has begun in the mountain waterways and more importantly the attractive high pasture lands have begun to attract visitors on trekking holidays. Traditionally in this part of the world people would move their sheep and cattle to the high pastures (yayla) for summer grazing and today this has become something of an event with summer folklore festivals in places like Sis Dağı attracting visitors from all over Turkey, who come to hear the Kemençe and watch people dance the Horon. The sale of local costumes and craftwork such as wooden toys and woven goods bring extra income to the district.

The climate is typical of the Black Sea region; it rains in every season and in the high mountains it snows in winter. The mountain hinterland is hard to access, with many dirt roads and the villages are continuously shrinking as the villagers migrate to Turkey's larger cities in search of work.

Görele itself is a large town of 27,000 people on the Black Sea coast. The Black Sea coast highway from Giresun to Trabzon runs through here and Görele is about halfway between the two cities, 70 km from each. There is no real port at Görele so goods and people all come though this coast road, but there is a small fishing fleet. The main industry is hazelnut processing, and in August the whole area is busy with people harvesting hazelnuts and bringing them into town.

Görele has its own kemençe style and tradition. Famous Görelean kemençe players include Halil Ağa and Picoğlu Osman.

History
The name is derived from the ancient city of Coralla, though that Pontic settlement was probably sited nearer to today's  Eynesil.

Much later there was a Genoese trading post here and the ruins of their castle is 20 km east of the town of
Görele today.
Chepni Turks arrived in Görele from Khorasan in the early years of the 13/14th century.

As the castle of Kordyle, this was one of the last Christian outposts to fall to Sultan Mehmet II after he conquered the Empire of Trebizond in 1461. According to Pontic ballads, it was defended against the Sultan's soldier by a peasant girl until she took her life by throwing herself from a window. According to William Miller, the window could still be seen up until the Crimean War.

From 1878 to 1922, it was a part of Ottoman Trebizond Vilayet. During the republican era, it became a part of newly founded Giresun province.

Görele, like the rest of this coast was occupied by Russian troops for two years during the First World War.

Prominent natives/residents
 Tuzcuoğlu Mehmet Ali, kemenche player
 Picoğlu Osman (1901-1946) famous kemençe player
 Hasan Ali Yücel poet and politician, former minister of education, and his son the poet Can Yücel
 Hamit Görele, artist and thinker
 Bedri Rahmi Eyüboğlu artist and poet
 Fatih Kırtorun, poet
 Salim PATAN, poet, writer and teacher
 Kemal Yayla, Police Commissioner
 Kemal Gürses, conductor and composer

See also
Mount Sis
Picoğlu Osman
Kemenche
Katip Şadi

References

External links

 Gorele News Official Page
 GoreleGenclik Official Page
 Gorele News Official Page
 Radyo Gorele Official Page
 Gorelespor  Official Page
 Gorele School Official Page
 Gorele  Official Page
 Gorele  Official Page
 Gorele Ekspres  Official Page
 Giresun page on Görele

Populated places in Giresun Province
Black Sea port cities and towns in Turkey
Fishing communities in Turkey
Populated coastal places in Turkey
Districts of Giresun Province
Towns in Turkey